Raffaello Ossola is a painter, born in Locarno, Switzerland, who has lived in Italy since 1990.

Ossola uses acrylic and has a distinctive style that incorporates elements such as architecture, pools, clouds, rocks, shrubs, and obelisks in surreal landscapes. His style uses characteristic light reflections and projections.

His works Sentimento and Equilibrio Temporale were exhibited in Galleria Gagliardi in San Gimignano, Italy.

References

External links
 Website Raffaello Ossola
 Website Raffaello Ossola (old one)

20th-century Swiss painters
Swiss male painters
21st-century Swiss painters
21st-century Swiss male artists
Living people
1954 births
People from Locarno
20th-century Swiss male artists